Putative ATP-binding cassette transporter sub-family C member 13 is a protein that is not present in humans. In humans, ABCC13 is a pseudogene.

Function 

This gene is a member of the superfamily of genes encoding ATP-binding cassette (ABC) transporters. ABC proteins transport various molecules across extra- and intra-cellular membranes. ABC genes are divided into seven distinct subfamilies (ABC1, MDR/TAP, MRP, ALD, OABP, GCN20, and White). This family member is part of the MRP subfamily, which is involved in multi-drug resistance, but the human locus is now thought to be a pseudogene incapable of encoding a functional ABC protein. Alternative splicing results in multiple transcript variants; however, not all variants have been fully described.

See also 
 ATP-binding cassette transporter

References

Further reading 

 
 
 
 
 
 
 

ATP-binding cassette transporters
Genes on human chromosome 21